René Reyes (born February 21, 1978) is a Venezuelan former professional baseball outfielder and switch-hitter. He played for the Colorado Rockies of Major League Baseball (MLB) in the 2003 and 2004 seasons.

Career
His only MLB experience came as a member of the Colorado Rockies in part of two seasons spanning –. In a two-season career, Reyes batted .220 with two home runs and eight RBI in 81 games.

After spending 2006 with the Rojos del Aguila de Veracruz of the Mexican League, 2007 with the Petroleros de Minatitlan, and 2008-2011 with the Pericos de Puebla, Reyes signed with the Rieleros de Aguascalientes on March 16, 2012. On June 29, 2013, Reyes was traded to the Diablos Rojos del Mexico. On March 31, 2014, Reyes was assigned to the Leones de Yucatán. On February 6, 2015, Reyes signed with the Rieleros de Aguascalientes, but on May 8, he was released. On May 21, 2015, he was assigned to the Toros de Tijuana, but released on July 6. On May 10, 2016, Reyes signed with the Vaqueros de Unión Laguna. On September 21, 2016, he was released. On May 16, 2017, Reyes signed with the Tigres de Quintana Roo. On July 5, 2017, he was traded to the Olmecas de Tabasco. On July 18, 2017, Reyes was released.

See also
 List of Major League Baseball players from Venezuela

References

External links
, or Venezuelan Professional Baseball League, or Sports Illustrated (World Team roster)

1978 births
Living people
Águilas del Zulia players
Arizona League Rockies players
Asheville Tourists players
Baseball players at the 2007 Pan American Games
Bravos de Margarita players
Cardenales de Lara players
Caribes de Anzoátegui players
Carolina Mudcats players
Central American and Caribbean Games bronze medalists for Venezuela
Colorado Rockies players
Colorado Springs Sky Sox players
Competitors at the 2006 Central American and Caribbean Games
Delfines de Ciudad del Carmen players
Diablos Rojos del México players
Leones del Caracas players
Leones de Yucatán players
Major League Baseball outfielders
Major League Baseball players from Venezuela
Mexican League baseball first basemen
Mexican League baseball outfielders
Olmecas de Tabasco players
People from Nueva Esparta
Pericos de Puebla players
Petroleros de Minatitlán players
Rieleros de Aguascalientes players
Rojos del Águila de Veracruz players
Tiburones de La Guaira players
Toros de Tijuana players
Tigres de Quintana Roo players
Venezuelan expatriate baseball players in Mexico
Venezuelan expatriate baseball players in the United States
Central American and Caribbean Games medalists in baseball
Pan American Games competitors for Venezuela